Fugit may refer to:

Fugit, a term in mathematical finance
Fugit Township, Decatur County, Indiana
Patrick Fugit, an American actor

See also
Tempus fugit (disambiguation)